Never Ending may refer to:

 "Never Ending" (Elvis Presley song), 1964
 "Never Ending" (Rihanna song), a song by Rihanna from her 2016 album Anti
 Never Ending (album), an album by Beres Hammond released in 2018
 Never-Ending, a 2004 album by Mystic Prophecy
 Never Ending Tour, a name for Bob Dylan's endless touring schedule since 1988
 Any of Bob Dylan's tours from 1988 and on, see Never Ending Tour#Tours.
 The Never Ending, an American indie rock and folk band